Kris Laferla (born 23 March 1967) is a former Maltese footballer who played as a midfielder during his career.

Club career 

At the age of 16, Laferla got his senior team debut for St. Andrew's on 12 December 1983 in a 0–0 draw against Birżebbuġa St. Peter's. Following his exploits in the Third Division, Laferla joined Premier League side Valletta on loan for the 1985–86 season. He made his debut against Żurrieq on 1 September 1985, and his first goal arrived from the penalty spot in the match against Tarxien Rainbows on 6 September 1986. After joining permanently, he soon became a regular figure with Valletta, even becoming club captain. With the Citizens, Laferla won 25 honours, including six in the 2000–01 season, making him one of the most decorated players in Maltese football.

In December 2002, Laferla moved to Sliema Wanderers, making his debut in a 5–0 win over Marsa. He finished his career by playing over 500 games in the top-tier of Maltese football.

International career 

Laferla made his debut with the Maltese national team in the 0–5 defeat against Sweden. In total he made 65 appearances, scoring six goals in the process, including the winner against Estonia. Laferla also captained the national team on 16 occasions, amongst them being the game against Italy played in 1993 where he missed a penalty in the 1–2 defeat.

International goals 

"Score" represents the score in the match after Laferla's goal.

Personal life 
Laferla, having retired from football, now owns a nightclub in Paceville. He is married, and has three children; Jessica, Matthew and Juliana.

References

External links 
 

Living people
1967 births
Maltese footballers
Malta international footballers
Association football midfielders
St. Andrews F.C. players
Valletta F.C. players
Sliema Wanderers F.C. players
Maltese Premier League players